Rory John McCaughan Gorman (born 26 October 1992) is a footballer who plays as a winger.

He started his career with Manchester City, but was soon signed by Manchester United. After six years there, he was released and allowed to join Wolverhampton Wanderers in 2009. Gorman made just one appearance for Wolves before spending time on loan with Plymouth Argyle, Macclesfield Town and Cambridge United, followed by a permanent move to Leyton Orient where he remained for a season.

Born in Sheffield, he first played international football for the Republic of Ireland at under-16 level, but soon switched allegiance to Northern Ireland, playing through all the age grades before receiving his first cap for the senior team in 2010.

Club career
Gorman was born in Sheffield, and began his football career as a nine-year-old with Manchester City in 2002. A year later, he was signed by Manchester United, where he stayed until 2009, when he joined the Wolverhampton Wanderers Academy. During this time, he earned numerous caps at various Northern Ireland junior levels.

Gorman attended Repton School in Derbyshire, for whom he played in the 2010 Independent Schools Football Association Boodles Cup Final against Shrewsbury School. During his studies, he won the "Michael Bristow Academy Scholar of the Year" and "Wolves' Academy Player of the Year" awards for the 2010–11 season, as well as finishing runner-up in the Daily Telegraph/Aviva-sponsored "School Sport Matters Awards 2010 – Male Student of the Year" award.

Gorman signed his first professional contract in March 2011, a two-year deal which was to keep him with the club until the summer of 2013. He made his club debut when he appeared as a substitute in a 2–1 Premier League defeat at Norwich City on 24 March 2012, which was to be his only first team appearance for Wolves.

The midfielder joined League Two side Plymouth Argyle on loan for five months on 6 August 2012, for whom he scored his first competitive goal in a 3–0 League Cup win on his debut against Portsmouth on 14 August. However, as a result of a lack of regular first team opportunities at Plymouth, he returned to Wolves on 22 September 2012.

On 31 January 2013, he joined non-league Macclesfield Town on loan until 1 March, but only made one substitute appearance. His loan with Macclesfield over, he joined another Conference club for the remainder of the season when he was loaned to Cambridge United, where he made two appearances.

Gorman's contract at Wolves expired at the end of the 2012–13 season and it was announced that it would not be renewed, leaving him a free agent. He left having made only one first-team appearance for the club. After impressing on trial earlier in the summer, Gorman signed a one-year contract with Leyton Orient on 1 August 2013. He found his opportunities limited at Orient, and at the end of the season he was released by the club along with four other players.

On 22 August 2014, Gorman signed for non-league side Southport.

On 4 October 2014, Gorman signed non-contract terms with Conference North side Barrow following his release from Southport.

In summer 2016, he joined Curzon Ashton.

In February 2017 he joined Atherton Collieries on dual registration terms.

In November 2018 he joined Frome Town

International career
Despite having never played a senior game at club level, Gorman made his international debut on 26 May 2010 – aged 17 years and 222 days – for Northern Ireland in a 2–0 friendly defeat to Turkey played in Connecticut, USA. He made his competitive international debut in UEFA Euro 2012 qualifying in a 1–0 victory in Slovenia on 3 September 2010.

Personal life
He is studying for a degree in psychology at the University of Bath.

References

External links

1992 births
Living people
Footballers from Sheffield
Association footballers from Northern Ireland
Northern Ireland youth international footballers
Northern Ireland international footballers
Association football wingers
Manchester City F.C. players
Manchester United F.C. players
Wolverhampton Wanderers F.C. players
Plymouth Argyle F.C. players
Macclesfield Town F.C. players
Cambridge United F.C. players
Leyton Orient F.C. players
Southport F.C. players
Premier League players
English Football League players
National League (English football) players
AFC Telford United players
Colwyn Bay F.C. players
Northwich Victoria F.C. players
Atherton Collieries A.F.C. players
Ashton United F.C. players
Frome Town F.C. players
Curzon Ashton F.C. players